The ZTE Max Duo LTE is a phablet smartphone designed, developed, and marketed by ZTE. The phone was released in August 2015.

Specifications

General specs

Software
The ZTE Max Duo runs Android Lollipop 5.1.1 launched in 2014.

See also
 List of Android devices
 ZTE
 List of ZTE products
 ZTE Blade

References

External links

 Official website

Phablets
Android (operating system) devices
Mobile phones introduced in 2015